Glovo is a Spanish quick-commerce start-up founded in Barcelona, Spain, in 2015 by Oscar Pierre and Sacha Michaud. It is an on-demand courier service that purchases, picks up, and delivers products ordered through its mobile app. It offers multiple services with food delivery being the most popular.

In July 2022, Delivery Hero completed the acquisition of a majority stake in Glovo.

History 

Founded by Oscar Pierre (CEO) and co-founder Sacha Michaud, Glovo's first meetings were in a McDonald's. It eventually expanded into other countries, but, in January 2020, Glovo ended its operations in Turkey, Egypt, Puerto Rico and Uruguay.

In October 2020, in an effort to achieve profitability, Glovo's remaining Latin American operations were purchased by Delivery Hero (DH), a German company, in a deal worth US$272 million, leaving Glovo with just its Southern and Eastern Europe operations. In September 2022, Glovo was fined $78 million for labor breaches in Spain.

In December 2021, DH signed a deal to become Glovo's majority shareholder, acquiring an additional 39.4% stake of the Spanish delivery company. The acquisition was completed in July 2022 and since then it has owned a majority stake in Glovo (94%).

Locations

As of January 2019, Glovo is operational in 25 countries:

 Andorra
 Armenia
 Bosnia and Herzegovina
 Bulgaria
 Croatia
 Georgia
 Ghana
 Italy
 Côte d'Ivoire
 Kazakhstan
 Kenya
 Kyrgyzstan
 Moldova
 Montenegro
 Morocco
 Nigeria
 Poland
 Portugal
 Romania
 Serbia
 Slovenia
 Spain
 Tunisia
 Uganda
 Ukraine

Services 
Food delivery service is the company's most popular service. Other services available include pharmacy, courier and quiero (anything).

The food business allows users to find and place orders with their favourite restaurants which is picked up when ready and delivered to the user's doorstep. While this model continues to be its flagship service, the company is reported experimenting with CloudKitchens and Grocery Darkstores.

References

External links
 

2022 mergers and acquisitions
Spanish brands
Retail companies established in 2015
Transport companies established in 2015
Internet properties established in 2015
Online food ordering
Multinational companies headquartered in Spain
2015 establishments in Catalonia